Lyr or LYR may refer to:

Mythology 
 Llŷr, Welsh character
 Lir, Irish character
 Leir of Britain, mythical king

Transport 
 Lancashire and Yorkshire Railway
 Svalbard Airport, Longyear, Norway (by IATA code)
 Layar LRT station, Singapore (by LRT station code)

Other uses 
 Lyra (Lyr), an astronomical constellation
 LYR, a band led by Simon Armitage